Boussart is a surname. Notable people with the surname include:

 André Joseph Boussart (1758–1813), French soldier and general
 Caroline Boussart (1808–1891), Belgian writer

See also
 Boussard, surname